Hutt is a surname. Notable people with it include:

 John Hutt (1795–1880), Governor of Western Australia from 1839 to 1846
 Joan Hutt (1913–1985), English painter
 Mark Hutt, known for the murder of Donna Jones
 Michael Hutt (disambiguation), multiple people
 William Hutt (disambiguation), multiple people